William Ellis Groben, usually known as W. Ellis Groben, is an American  architect and author.  He was Washington (D.C.) Office Architect of the U.S. Forest Service during 1933-1953 and provided professional guidance as the national consulting architect of the service, leading architectural style development.

He was an "outstanding architect" and also talented as an artist.

Groben wrote the important 1940 document "Architectural Trend of Future Forest Service Buildings".

He designed the Forest Services' International Institute of Tropical Forestry building in Puerto Rico.

Groben was "a native of" Philadelphia and studied architecture at the University of Pennsylvania and the Ecole des Beaux Arts.  He apprenticed in and near Philadelphia, and was hired as Chief Architect for the city of Philadelphia.

He designed three Pennsylvania movie theatres:
Hiway Theatre, 212 Old York Road, Jenkintown, PA 19046
Carman Theatre, Germantown Avenue and Roy Street, Philadelphia, PA 19140
Oxford Theatre, 7209-7211 Rising Sun Avenue, Philadelphia, PA 19111
In 1936 he designed renovation of the Embassy Theatre, later known as the York Road Theatre.

Works
Works include:

See also
Architects of the United States Forest Service

References

Artists from Washington, D.C.
20th-century American architects
Architects from Philadelphia